Suzanne A. "Suzie" Bombardier, (March 14, 1966June 22, 1980) was kidnapped, raped, and stabbed to death on June 22, 1980. On December 11, 2017, after extensive DNA profiling, 63-year-old Mitchell Lynn Bacom, a convicted sex offender, was arrested as the prime suspect. He was charged with and convicted of kidnapping, rape, oral copulation, murder, and murder with use of a deadly weapon. This was Antioch's oldest cold case murder. At the time of Bombardier's homicide, Bacom was known to her family.

Bombardier was raped, stabbed in the chest, and her heart was punctured. She was kidnapped from her sister's townhome in Antioch while she was babysitting her nieces. Her sister, Stephanie Mullen, arrived home at 4:00 a.m. to find Bombardier missing. Bombardier's father, Ted, said that she knew her killer, as there was no forced entry.

Background 
Fourteen-year-old Bombardier was an honor roll student at Antioch Junior High at the time of her homicide. She also belonged to the California Junior Scholastic Federation. She was buried at Queen of Heaven Cemetery in Lafayette. Jennifer Kathleen Gibbons came across her grave in 2014 and started blogging about the unsolved case. This kept it top of mind for the public and later for investigators.

In 2015, DNA samples from Bombardier's case were sent to the San Mateo County Sheriff's Office Forensic Laboratory for them to create a DNA profile. In early 2017, after advancements in DNA analysis technology, Antioch police were notified that a CODIS hit was made that tentatively identified Bacom as the perpetrator. After additional testing, when the samples were conclusively linked to Bacom through a federal DNA database, he was taken into custody without incident at his home.

In 1973 Bacom was tried for several crimes, convicted, and sentenced to five years to life imprisonment. In 1981 he was convicted for several more crimes and sentenced to 24 years in prison. In 2002 he failed to register as a sex offender and was sentenced to four years in prison.

Perpetrator 
Mitchell Lynn Bacom (born March 21, 1954) is a native of Knightsen, California. He has brown eyes, and brown hair. He is 5'7", and weighs 185 pounds. He was a suspect in the case for a long time. Authorities will attempt to match Bacom's DNA to other cold cases.

On March 15, 2022, a Contra Costa jury convicted Mitchell Bacom for the murder of 14-year-old Suzanne Bombardier. Bacom was convicted of first-degree murder, along with special circumstances for the commission of the murder during the course of the burglary, kidnapping, and rape.

Bacom was sentenced to life in prison without the possibility of parole on June 27, 2022. At the sentencing hearing, prosecutors said Bacom allegedly confessed to a former cellmate that he "raped and sliced" sex workers across the country when he was a truck driver.

See also 
 
 List of kidnappings
 List of solved missing person cases

References

External links 
 Defrosting Cold Cases
 KTVU News video report for low-vision readers
 NBC News video report for low-vision readers

1980s missing person cases
1980 murders in the United States
Antioch, California
Female murder victims
Formerly missing people
Incidents of violence against girls
June 1980 events in the United States
Kidnapped American children
Kidnappings in the United States
Murdered American children
Missing person cases in California
Antioch, California
Rape in the United States
Stabbing attacks in 1980
Stabbing attacks in the United States
Deaths by stabbing in California